The Roman Catholic Diocese of Chilaw (Lat: Dioecesis Chilavensis) is a diocese of the Latin Church of the Roman Catholic Church in Sri Lanka.

Erected as the Diocese of Galle in 1939, the diocese is suffragan to the Archdiocese of Colombo. In 1995, part of the diocese was split off to form the Diocese of Kurunegala.

The current bishop is Warnakulasurya Wadumestrige Devasritha Valence Mendis, appointed in 2006.

Ordinaries
 Louis Perera, O.M.I. † (5 Jan 1939 Appointed - 8 Apr 1939 Died)
Edmund Peiris, O.M.I. † (12 Jan 1940 Appointed - 27 Dec 1972 Resigned)
Frank Marcus Fernando, † (27 Dec 1972 Succeeded - 19 Oct 2006 Retired)
Valence Mendis, (19 Oct 2006 Succeeded - 9 Oct 2021 Appointed, Bishop of Kandy)

See also
Roman Catholicism in Sri Lanka

References

External links

Chilaw